Jordan Carlos (born February 2, 1978) is an American stand-up comedian who played a recurring character on The Colbert Report and is a co-host on the Nickelodeon kids' show Me TV. He also appeared as a panelist and reporter on The Nightly Show with Larry Wilmore.

Career

Early career
Jordan Carlos graduated Brown University in 2001 and began work as a copywriter in a New York ad firm. At night and on weekends Carlos performed stand-up comedy. Eventually Carlos abandoned advertising altogether in favor of stand-up although he feels he had trouble finding a niche audience because he "wasn't a stereotypical black man". He learned to use that characteristic as the basis for many of his jokes.

Role on The Colbert Report
On The Colbert Report Carlos played Alan, host Stephen Colbert's "black friend". Whenever Colbert discussed racial issues, he often asked that a picture of him with his African-American co-worker Alan be shown on screen. Colbert sometimes referred to him as "Alan, my black friend Alan". Alan first appeared on a Martin Luther King Day program when Colbert, complaining about having to work on the holiday, brought Alan into the argument, hoping that Alan was angry because he had to work, too. To Colbert's surprise, Alan was not.

On The Nightly Show
Carlos was a writer on The Nightly Show with Larry Wilmore and also appeared in sketches and, often, on the panel. His characters include Carlos Jordanson (a Hillary Clinton campaign aide) and Dennis Rodman.

Other appearances
In 2008, Carlos did voice work for the animated comedy webseries Amazing the Lion hosted by the Independent Comedy Network. Carlos has appeared as a special guest in "Episode 253: Chuuch" of the Keith and the Girl podcast. He also made an appearance in Nickelback's "Rockstar" music video and has been a commentator on the E! Network's Worst Dating Show Moments. He made a brief appearance in the buddy cop film Cop Out. Also, he played the math teacher in the short film The Old Man and the Seymour and he was cast in a main role on the MTV series I Just Want My Pants Back.

Carlos has also made appearances in CollegeHumor.com's original videos. Most recently, he portrayed President Barack Obama hosting a barbecue in the video entitled, "Barack Obama's BBQ".

Jordan Carlos was a cast member on Guy Code, Guy Court and Girl Code. He also appeared on two episodes in the first season of MTV's "Joking Off". Carlos also provided the voice of Gene on the animated series Super 4, but quit after the second-season premiere to focus more on his comedy-career.

Filmography

Fim

Television

Music videos

Podcasts

References

External links
 What's my shtick? Being black. (Editorial)
 
 Comedy Central profile
  Jordan Carlos on MTV

African-American stand-up comedians
American stand-up comedians
American male comedians
21st-century American comedians
Living people
Brown University alumni
Greenhill School alumni
21st-century African-American people
1978 births